Pedro II Nkanga a Mvika was a ruler of the kingdom of Kongo during the kingdom's first conflict with the Portuguese. He was the founder of the royal House of Nsundi and could trace his descent to one of Afonso I's daughters. He was succeeded by his son Garcia I, who was crowned in 1624.

Career
Pedro II served in the provincial government of Manikongo Álvaro III Nimi a Mpanzu as Marquis of Wembo and later as Duke of Mbamba. Manikongo Álvaro III had no heir apparent as he was a young man with older uncles who wished to rule. When he died in 1622, Pedro II was elected as a compromise candidate. King Pedro II's father was from the province of Nsundi, where Pedro himself was born, and thus his royal house is known by that name or simply the Kinkanga kanda.

Character
Pedro was widely regarded as a virtuous man and a model Christian. The Jesuits, who had recently arrived in Kongo held him up as a paragon of Christian deportment.

War with Angola
No sooner had he come to the throne than the governor of Angola, João Correia de Sousa, sent an army into Kongo claiming that he had the right to choose the mwenekongo. Besides that, Sousa accused Pedro of harboring runaway slaves from Angola during his tenure as Duke of Mbamba.

Battle of Mbumbi
Fresh from a victory against Nambu a Ngongo, a southern neighbor of Kongo, a 20,000 strong Portuguese army with its Imbangala allies entered Mbamba and was met by the Duke at Mbumbi. Although the Duke's men fought bravely and scattered a portion of the Portuguese army, he was badly outnumbered having only his own small force and that of the Marquis of Mpemba who managed to join him. The Portuguese defeated and killed both nobles. They were later eaten by Portugal's Imbangala troops.

Battle of Mbandi Kasi
Pedro II immediately declared Angola an enemy of the state and brought the main army down from Kongo to meet the invaders at Mbanda Kasi. The army of Kongo crushed the Portuguese and the Imbangala and forced them out of Kongo entirely. In the aftermath of this, anti-Portuguese riots broke out all over the kingdom and threatened its long established merchant community. Portuguese throughout the country were humiliatingly disarmed and even forced to give up their clothes.

Pedro II set up camp at Mbana Kasi and wrote numerous letters of protest to Rome and the king of Spain (then also the ruler of Portugal). As a result of these letters and protests by Portuguese merchants in Kongo and Angola, João Correia de Sousa was recalled in disgrace, and some 1,200 slaves were eventually returned from Brazil. Pedro, anxious not to alienate the Portuguese merchant community, and aware that they had generally remained loyal during the war, did as much as he could to preserve their lives and property, leading some of his detractors to call him "King of Portuguese".

Birth of the Dutch Alliance
Pedro also wrote to the Dutch States General proposing that the newly formed West India Company assist him in an attack on Luanda, with the BaKongo attacking by land and the Dutch by sea. Although he died before this alliance could be affected, the steady alliance between Kongo and the Netherlands would persist, eventually coming to fruition in 1641 with the Dutch attack on Luanda.

References

See also
Kingdom of Kongo
List of rulers of Kongo
House of Nsundi
History of Angola

Manikongo of Kongo
17th-century African people
Year of birth unknown
Year of death missing